André Simard (born 22 November 1953) is a Canadian politician, who was elected to the National Assembly of Quebec in a by-election on 29 November 2010, representing the electoral district of Kamouraska-Témiscouata.

He ran unsuccessful in the redrawn riding of Côte-du-Sud in the 2012 and 2014 elections.

External links

References

Living people
Parti Québécois MNAs
People from Bas-Saint-Laurent
1953 births
21st-century Canadian politicians
Canadian veterinarians
Male veterinarians